Albert Edward Glover (1849–11 September 1941) was a New Zealand politician of the Liberal Party.

Biography

Early life and career
Glover was born in Nottingham, England, in 1849. At age 13 he sailed with his parents to New Zealand and arrived in Auckland in 1862. Afterwards he spent several years working for his father in a hotel he owned in the Coromandel. He then became involved in mining and moved to Thames during the gold rush. Later, Glover returned to Coromandel after unsuccessfully prospecting for gold and then had a holiday in Rarotonga. Upon returning he set up business in Auckland importing fruit from the island and selling it on to local grocers. He would remain in the trade until his retirement from business in 1920.

Political career

Glover became involved politically and joined the local branch of the Liberal-Labour Federation. In 1893 he was elected to the Auckland City Council where he would serve two separate spells totaling 16 years combined. In addition he was also a member of the Auckland Harbour Board, Hospital Board and Schools Committee.

Glover stood for Parliament in 1908 and was elected to represent the  electorate. He ran against former Mayor of Auckland Alfred Kidd (the incumbent), both were from the Liberal Party, and it was not unusual at the time for there to be more than one Liberal candidate. Glover held the seat for three terms until 1919, when he was defeated by Labour candidate Bill Parry. Three years later he attempted to regain the Auckland Central seat for the Liberal Party, but was again beaten by Parry.

In 1929 he stood unsuccessfully for the Auckland City Council as an independent candidate.

Rugby league administrator
As the local MP, Glover chaired a meeting of 150 people on 20 July 1909 that formed the Auckland Rugby League. Glover was elected one of the ARL's first Vice-Presidents at the meeting.

Later life and death
Glover's wife Nancy died in 1934 aged 85. The Glover's had five children, three sons and two daughters. Glover died on 11 September 1941 aged 92. He was survived by all five of his children.

 

His son James Glover, then resident in Australia, enlisted in the Australian Imperial Force  (AIF) eight times between 1915 and 1918 but was discharged for a raft of military offenses. In 1918 he was in the Rabaul Relief Force, but was discharged for drunkenness and using obscene language or creating a disturbance. Postwar he received two campaign medals, the British War Medal and the Victory Medal.

References

1849 births
1941 deaths
New Zealand people of English descent
Auckland City Councillors
New Zealand Liberal Party MPs
New Zealand rugby league administrators
New Zealand MPs for Auckland electorates
Members of the New Zealand House of Representatives
Unsuccessful candidates in the 1922 New Zealand general election
Unsuccessful candidates in the 1919 New Zealand general election
Auckland Harbour Board members